The 2013 MercedesCup was a men's tennis tournament held at the Tennis Club Weissenhof in Stuttgart, Germany. Janko Tipsarević was the defending champion, but chose not to compete.
Fabio Fognini won the title, defeating Philipp Kohlschreiber in the final, 5–7, 6–4, 6–4.

Seeds
The top four seeds receive a bye into the second round.

Draw

Finals

Top half

Bottom half

Qualifying

Seeds
The first three seeds received a bye into the second round.

Qualifiers

Qualifying draw

First qualifier

Second qualifier

Third qualifier

Fourth qualifier

References

External links
 Main draw
 Qualifying draw

Stuttgart Open Singles
Singles 2013